The Tenants' Strike or Broom Strike of 1907 was a popular movement against the rise in rents in tenant houses in the city of Buenos Aires and other Argentine cities, popularly called conventillos. The strike began in August 1907, it lasted approximately 3 months and more than one hundred tenants participated in the movement, with thirty-two thousand workers on strike. It had a significant presence of anarchist and socialist activists.

Background

Argentina at the beginning of the 20th century

Agro-exporting Argentina, sustained by an open economy, formed its market and its nation-state around 1880. It became a country that received foreign capital and massive immigration, mainly Italians and Spanish people, who arrived in search of non-existent living and working conditions in Europe at the time, giving rise to a growing urbanization process.  

Between 1895 and 1905, the vegetative growth of the City of Buenos Aires reached 52.5% and total migration 65.5%, a percentage of which 51.8% belonged to non-natives. For 1900, it was calculated that the migratory balance was about 50,485 people and in 1907 the figure practically doubled, reaching 119,861 people.

The city became an important center of attraction for the newly arrived immigrants who settled as tenants or laborers in the rural environment or, alternatively, settled in the capital to participate in the economic life of the city. After In 1890, the growth of the population aggravated the housing problem for the popular sectors. Buenos Aires spread to the periphery, forming new neighborhoods, but most of them settled in tenement houses, which proliferated throughout the city.

The tenements were transformed into the most usual and characteristic workers accommodation. In 1904, the Municipal Census indicated that there were 11.5 people per house in the Federal Capital, almost all of them on one floor. The statistics reported that of the 950,891 inhabitants of the city, 138,188 lived in the 43,873 rooms that made up the 2,462 Buenos Aires tenancy houses. That is, more than 10% of the population lived in tenements. 

From 1905, rents maintained an upward trend and by 1907 the price of a room was triple that of 1870. "The costs of humble rooms were eight times higher than in Paris and London."

Living conditions in the tenements
In 1900 the conventillos used to have a cement patio, bathrooms and some showers. Between 20 and 70 people had a single latrine to attend to their needs and "the ammonia fumes that escape inside make those who enter them experience discomfort and tears." The rooms were small in size, with little ventilation or windowless, where up to 10 people lived.

The room in a central house cost around 20 pesos at least and could go up from 5 to 7 pesos more with a window facing the street, constituting a substantial part of the workers' budget.

In 1890, the tenants organized a commission for the first time to take action against the landlords. The movement failed but resurfaced three years later from the attempt to form a "League Against Rentals", although general indifference ended up dissolving it. In any case, the almost constant rise in rents generated, in 1905, the unusual joint proposal of anarchists, socialists and trade unionists who wrote a manifesto to propose the formation of a league against the high cost of living, although it did not materialize.

From then on, and through the action of subcommittees, propaganda and conferences, the preaching against the almost continuous rise in rents and tax charges that decimated the wages of the workers was intensified.

Strike of 1907
In 1906 the Argentine Regional Workers Federation (FORA) led the campaign for the reduction of rents and formed the League of Struggle against High Rents and Taxes. In August 1907, through a municipal decree, there was a tax increase which was transferred to the price of the rooms located in the tenements. In this context, the tenement house on Calle Ituzaingó went on strike, refusing to pay the rent. The strikers formed a central committee in search of new adhesions, reduction of work to 8 hours a day and a salary increase. By the beginning of October 1907, around 1000 conventillos went on strike, the movement spread through the cities of Rosario and Bahía Blanca. As a result of the repression, the anarchist militant Miguel Pepe was assassinated by the police under orders of the Chief of Police Ramón Falcón. In 1909, Falcón was in turn assassinated by an anarchist militant, of Ukrainian origin, named Simón Radowitzky.

The Tenant Strike was one of the most important demonstrations of the time, marking a turning point in subsequent struggles for the right to housing in Argentina.

References

Bibliography
 Suriano, Juan. La huelga de inquilinos de 1907. CEAL, Buenos Aires, 1983.
 Noemí M. Girbal-Blacha. La huelga de inquilinos de 1907 en Buenos Aires.

External links
 10903: La ley maldita, Revista El Abasto.
 Anarkos, artículo de Felipe Pigna.
Prensa Obrera: A 109 de la huelga de inquilinos, Christian Rath
El historiador: La huelga de inquilinos de 1907, Felipe Pigna/

History of anarchism
1907 in Argentina
Labour movement
Anarchism in Argentina
Labour disputes in Argentina